The Roller skating competition at the 2006 Central American and Caribbean Games was held in Cartagena, Colombia. The tournament was scheduled to be held from 15 to 30 July 2006.

Medal summary

Men's events

Road

Track

Women's events

Road

Track

Medal table

References

 

2006 Central American and Caribbean Games
2006
2006 in roller sports